Toxicity is the second studio album by American heavy metal band System of a Down, released on September 4, 2001, through American Recordings and Columbia Records. Expanding on their 1998 eponymous debut, it incorporated more melody, harmonies, and singing than the band's first album. Categorized primarily as alternative metal and nu metal, Toxicity features elements of multiple genres, including folk, progressive rock, jazz, and Armenian and Greek music, including prominent use of instruments like the sitar, banjo, keyboards, and piano. It contains a wide array of political and non-political themes, such as mass incarceration, the CIA, the environment, police brutality, drug addiction, scientific reductionism, and groupies.

Toxicity was recorded at Cello Studios in Hollywood, California. Over 30 songs were recorded, but the band narrowed the number of songs on the album to 14. The album peaked at number one on both the Billboard 200 and the Canadian Albums Chart, sold 220,000 copies in its first week of release, was certified  by the Recording Industry Association of America by July 2022, and has shipped at least six million copies in the United States. All of Toxicity singles reached the Billboard Hot 100. The final single, "Aerials", went to number one on both the Mainstream Rock Tracks and the Modern Rock Tracks charts. Toxicity received mainly positive ratings and reviews from critics, among them perfect ratings from AllMusic, Kerrang!, and Blabbermouth.net. Many critics praised the album's sound and innovation, and it ranked on multiple year-end lists.

The promotional shows for Toxicity resulted in a number of controversial incidents. A six-hour riot ensued at a free concert in Hollywood the day before the album's release as a result of the show's cancellation due to an overcrowded show; the crowd in attendance was estimated to be at least twice the size which was expected, another scheduled System of a Down performance was also canceled to prevent a similar riot. The band then toured with Slipknot, and bassist Shavo Odadjian was harassed, racially profiled, and physically beaten by guards when he tried to enter backstage at a concert in October 2001.

Music, writing, and recording

Primarily considered an alternative metal and nu metal album, Toxicity has also been described as thrash metal, art metal, hard rock, progressive metal, and heavy metal. Toxicity features elements of multiple genres of music: folk, progressive rock, jazz, hip hop, Middle Eastern music, and Greek music. System of a Down guitarist Daron Malakian said that he "wanted to add a bit more harmony for" himself "in the songs and that required tastefully mixing in some softer guitars between the really heavy parts". Malakian also cited the Beatles as an influence on Toxicity. Sounds of instruments other than drums, vocals, electric guitar and bass guitar, such as sitar, banjo, keyboards and piano, are also featured on Toxicity. The majority of the album's music was written in the tuning of drop C.

System of a Down recorded over thirty songs during the recording of Toxicity but narrowed the number of songs on the album to fourteen. Several of these recorded songs that didn't make it onto Toxicity were re-recorded for System of a Down's next studio album Steal This Album!, an album released in 2002. Toxicity was recorded at Cello Studios in Hollywood, California, mixed at Enterprise Studios in Burbank, California, and mastered at Oasis Mastering in Studio City, California. According to System of a Down bassist Shavo Odadjian, the song "Chop Suey!" is "about drug addiction, but [System of a Down took] something really serious and made it a little quacky". System of a Down vocalist Serj Tankian compared the song to Guns N' Roses' "Mr. Brownstone". "Prison Song" is about mass incarceration. Serj Tankian said: "It's about the unfairness of mandatory minimum sentences and how there are about 2,000,000 Americans in jail, and a lot of them are in there for marijuana possession and things of that sort. [...] Instead of rehabilitating men who have drug problems, they're throwing them in prison. That's not really solving anything." Tankian said that "Prison Song" also addresses "how drug money is used to rig elections in other countries by the CIA". "Needles" is about "pulling a tapeworm out of your ass." "Bounce" is about group sex. "Psycho" is about groupies. "ATWA" (an acronym for "Air, Trees, Water, Animals") is about Charles Manson's beliefs on the environment. Malakian has said that "[Manson is] in jail for the wrong reasons. I think he had an unfair trial". "Deer Dance" is about the protests surrounding the 2000 Democratic National Convention.

Promotion and touring
On September 3, 2001, System of a Down had planned on launching Toxicity at a free concert in Hollywood, California as a "thank you" to fans. The concert, which was to be held in a parking lot, was set up to accommodate 3,500 people; however, an estimated 7,000 to 10,000 fans showed up. Because of the large excess number of fans, the performance was cancelled by police officers just before System of a Down took the stage. No announcement was made that the concert had been cancelled. Fans waited for more than an hour for the band to appear, but when a banner hanging at the back of the stage that read "System of a Down" was removed by security, the audience rushed the stage, destroying all the band's touring gear (approximately $30,000 worth of equipment) and began to riot, throwing rocks at police, breaking windows, and knocking over portable toilets. The riot lasted six hours, during which six arrests were made. The band's manager, David "Beno" Benveniste, later said that the riot could have been avoided if System of a Down had been permitted to perform or had they been allowed to make a statement at the concert regarding the cancellation. System of a Down's scheduled in-store performance the next day was cancelled to prevent a similar riot.

Later that month, System of a Down embarked on tour in the United States and Mexico with Slipknot. During their concert at Grand Rapids, Michigan's Van Andel Arena in October 2001, Odadjian was harassed, racially profiled and physically beaten by some guards when he attempted to enter backstage. After the attack, he received medical help from the arena personnel and the police in place. Odadjian then filed a lawsuit against DuHadway Kendall Security, the company the guards were working for. Despite this incident, the tour, as a whole, was a success and System of a Down later co-headlined the Pledge of Allegiance leg of Slipknot's Iowa World Tour.

Reception

Critical

On review aggregator website Metacritic, Toxicity holds a score of 73 out of 100, based on reviews from nine critics, which indicates "generally favourable reviews". AllMusic writer Eduardo Rivadavia called Toxicity "hands down one of 2001's top metal releases" and wrote that the album "may well prove to be a lasting heavy metal classic to boot". Toxicity is one of only 21 albums to achieve a perfect rating from Blabbermouth.net, with writer Don Kaye praising System of a Down in a contemporary review of the album as "one of the few bands that people may still be talking about ten years from now". Drowned in Sound writer Don Kaye praised the band as "probably the most vital band around in the big, wide world of metal right now". Ben Myers of Kerrang! stated that the band had "gone and bettered" their debut album and hailed Toxicity as "metal album of the year, hands down". Q wrote that Toxicity "matches Slipknot for manic intensity while employing a freeform approach to songcraft which invites comparison to the lunatic-fringe rock of the '60s".

Referring to Toxicity as "both manic and schizoid", Keith Harris of Rolling Stone noted Tankian's ability to veer "easily from sing-rap rhythm to Korn-ish hysterics to demonic baritone growl to doomily ruminative" and that "the music insists on forward motion without trapping itself in a thrashy lock-step rut". Tom Sinclair of Entertainment Weekly called the album "strange and engaging", with a wide variety of sounds which "all adds up to bizarro type of metal that has a warped majesty and strength". Robert Christgau of The Village Voice cited "Prison Song" and "Bounce" as highlights and later assigned the album a one-star honorable rating. Spins Joe Gross wrote that the band "have an undeniable nerd-prog charm". Uncut, on the other hand, panned Toxicity as "virtually unlistenable".

Commercial
Toxicity peaked at number one on the Billboard 200, selling 220,000 copies in its first week of release. The album also topped the Canadian Albums Chart. Toxicity sold at least 2,700,000 copies in the United States, and at least 12,000,000 copies worldwide. On November 27, 2002, the album was certified triple-platinum by the Recording Industry Association of America.

All of the album's singles reached the Billboard Hot 100; "Chop Suey!" peaked at number 76, "Toxicity" at number 70, and "Aerials" at number 55. "Aerials" would remain the band's biggest domestic hit until "B.Y.O.B." surpassed it, reaching number 27 in 2005. "Aerials" peaked at number one on the Mainstream Rock Songs chart and number one on the Alternative Songs chart. "Chop Suey!" and "Toxicity" were both top ten hits. In 2005, Toxicity went to number one on the Catalog Albums chart. Added to the 2001 Clear Channel memorandum, "Chop Suey!" was temporarily pulled from playlists of most radio stations after the September 11 attacks in 2001, as it featured some lyrics that Clear Channel deemed inappropriate following the attacks. The song returned to the airwaves when things settled down.

Accolades
The album is listed on Blender 500 CDs You Must Own. MusicRadar held a public poll and Toxicity was ranked as the 28th greatest heavy metal album on its list of The 50 Greatest Heavy Metal Albums of All Time. The album is ranked number 44 on Rolling Stone 100 Best Albums of the Decade for 2000s and 27th on the magazine's "100 Greatest Metal Albums of All Time". Toxicity was voted the 27th best album of the year in The Village Voices annual Pazz & Jop critics poll for 2001. Spin named the album one of The 300 Best Albums Of The Past 30 Years, with Toxicity being one of the highest-listed heavy metal albums on the list. Spin also named Toxicity the Album of the Year in 2001, and finally ranked it number 38 on its list of The 40 Greatest Metal Albums Of All Time. Kludge ranked it number five on their list of best albums of 2001. Alternative Press ranked it number nine on its 25 Best Albums of 2001. Mojo ranked it number 93 on its 100 Modern Classics. The album won a 2001 Metal Edge Readers' Choice Award for Album of the Year. Loudwire listed the album at number one on its list of Top 11 Metal Albums of the 2000s, number two on the Top 100 Hard Rock + Metal Albums Of The 21st Century, and number 11 on its list of Top 50 Metal Albums of All Time. NME listed the album at number six on its list of 20 Greatest Metal Albums Ever. Metal Hammer declared Toxicity the best album of 2001. The Observer ranked Toxicity as one of the Top 50 Albums Of The Decade, at number 34. In 2007, The Guardian placed the album on its list of the 1000 Albums To Hear Before You Die. Entertainment Weekly also put Toxicity on its list of the 100 Best Albums of the 1983–2008 Period, at number 90. Revolver named Toxicity the eighth greatest metal album of all time on its list of the 69 Greatest Metal Albums Of All Time. The album was included on The A.V. Clubs list of the best metal records of the 2000s. PopMatters ranked Toxicity at 62 on its Best Albums of the 2000s list. "Chop Suey" was nominated for Best Metal Performance at the 44th Grammy Awards in 2002. Spice Girl Melanie C picked it as one of her favourite albums. In 2020, the album was included at the 100 Best Albums of the 21st Century list of Stacker, being ranked at 85.

Track listing

Original release 

 "Arto" (track 15) is an adaptation of "Der Voghormia" (meaning "Lord Have Mercy"), a traditional Armenian church hymn. It is combined with Aerials (track 14) on physical releases as a hidden track.

French special edition

Japanese edition

 "Johnny", the Japanese bonus track, is put as the eighth track on Toxicity on the album's Japanese edition, pushing all tracks 8–14 on the album's normal track listing one track number forward.

Blue edition

 The Red Edition of the album features a bonus video disc with a 9:54-long behind-the-scenes video about the production of the record.

Personnel 

Adapted from Toxicity liner notes.

System of a Down
 Serj Tankian – vocals, keyboards, guitar on "Aerials", piano, string arrangements
 Daron Malakian – guitars, sitar, vocals
 Shavo Odadjian – bass
 John Dolmayan – drums

Additional musicians
 Arto Tunçboyacıyan – additional vocals/music
 Marc Mann – strings arrangement, conducting, additional strings writing

Artwork
 Martyn Atkins – photography  (studio)
 Glen E. Friedman – photography (back cover, water)
 John Dolmayan – photography 
 Hallie Sirota – photography
 Mark Wakefield – cover art
 Shavo Odadjian – art direction, album art concepts
 Brandy Flower – art direction, collage art
 System of a Down  – album art concepts
 John Dolmayan – collage art
 Shavo Odadjian – co-label art

Production and directing
 Rick Rubin – producer
 Daron Malakian – producer
 Serj Tankian – co-producer
 Andy Wallace –  mixing
 David Schiffman –  engineer
 Greg Collins – additional engineer
 Darren Mora – assistant engineer, additional engineer
 Al Sanderson – assistant engineer
 Ryan McCormick – assistant engineer
 Jim Champagne – assistant engineer
 Rich Balmer – mixdown engineer
 Dino Paredes – A&R direction
 Lindsay Chase – production coordinator
 Eddy Schreyer – mastering

Charts

Weekly charts

Year-end charts

Decade-end charts

Certifications

References

Citations

Bibliography

2001 albums
Albums produced by Rick Rubin
American Recordings (record label) albums
Columbia Records albums
System of a Down albums
Albums produced by Serj Tankian
Albums produced by Daron Malakian